Pilodeudorix bemba is a butterfly in the family Lycaenidae. It is found in Zambia, the Democratic Republic of the Congo (Shaba) and south-western Tanzania.

References

External links
Die Gross-Schmetterlinge der Erde 13: Die Afrikanischen Tagfalter. Plate XIII 66 b

Butterflies described in 1910
Deudorigini